Mirror Stream (Dzerkalʹnyi struminʹ; , Zerkalʹnaya struya) 
is a fountain in Kharkiv, Ukraine. The natural fountain was discovered in 1947.

The fountain is near the Kharkiv Philharmonic.
It was built in 1947. It remains one of the most remarkable architectural monuments in Kharkiv and, due to that, has been listed in UNESCO's Encyclopedia.

A "Komsomol Heroes Alley" with busts of young World War II heroes was located behind the fountain from 1958 until 2013. The busts were removed during the construction of the new church Khram Svyatykh Zhon-Myronosytsʹ, due to the 2015 decommunization laws they have never returned.

References

External links

Web camera of the fountain

Fountains in Ukraine
Buildings and structures in Kharkiv
Kyivskyi District (Kharkiv)